Norroy (also: Norroy-sur-Vair) is a commune in the Vosges department in Grand Est in northeastern France. Inhabitants are called Nogarésiens.

Geography
The highest point, in the south of the commune, is at 454 meters in the Châtillon Woods (Bois de Châtillon).

History
The commune of Norroy contained a command post which must have been given to the Knights Templar by the Count of Vaudémont. In the later medieval period revenues from the commune were split, two thirds going to the Dukes of Lorraine and one third to the Templar Commander at Robécourt. In 1751 the commune was subject to the bailiwick of Bourmont, and it was part of the Lamarche District under the post-revolution administrative structure in place between 1790 and 1800.

In terms of church administration, Norroy-sur-Vair was an annex to the parish of Mandres-sur-Vair, under the care of the presbytery at Bulgnéville.

See also
Communes of the Vosges department

References

Communes of Vosges (department)